The 2007 Australian Drivers' Championship was a motor racing title for drivers of Formula 3 racing cars, with the winner awarded the 2007 CAMS Gold Star. The title, which was the 51st Australian Drivers' Championship, was awarded to the winner of the 2007 Australian Formula 3 Championship. The championship, which began on 4 February 2007 (at Eastern Creek Raceway) and finished on 4 November at Oran Park, consisted of 16 races at 8 rounds across 4 different states.

The 2007 championship was notable for being one of the most competitive Australian Drivers Championships in years, with seven different drivers from three countries scoring race wins and ten drivers achieving at least one top three race placing. Four drivers, Tim Macrow, Leanne Tander, Charlie Hollings and James Winslow, had a mathematical chance of winning the championship heading into the final round. Whilst Winslow did not compete at that round due to a clash with his Formula V6 Asia commitments, the remaining trio fought out the title with Macrow coming from four points behind to win the championship in the final race of the season.

Classes
Competing cars were classified into one of three classes:
 The Championship Class, which was open to cars constructed in accordance with FIA Formula 3 regulations that applied between 1 January 1999 and 31 December 2004
 The National Class, which was open to cars constructed in accordance with FIA Formula 3 regulations that applied between 1 January 1999 and 31 December 2001
 The Trophy Class, which was open to cars constructed in accordance with FIA Formula 3 regulations that applied between 1 January 1995 and 31 December 1998

Points System
Points were awarded on 20–15–12–10–8–6–4–3–2–1 basis to the top ten finishers in the Championship Class in each race. An additional point was awarded to the driver setting the Championship Class pole position in the qualifying session for each race and a further point was awarded to the driver setting the fastest Championship Class race lap in each race. The point for fastest race lap was only awarded if the driver was a classified finisher in that race.

Points for the National Class and the Trophy Class were awarded on the same basis as for the Championship Class.

Teams and drivers
The following teams and drivers competed in championship.

Calendar

Results

References

Further reading
 Grant Rowley, The Annual - Australian Motor Sport, 2007 Edition, Australian Formula 3 Championship, pages 76–78

External links
 Official Australian Formula 3 website
 2007 Racing Results Archive 
 CAMS Online Manual of Motor Sport > About CAMS > CAMS Gold Star

Australian Drivers' Championship
Drivers' Championship
Australian Formula 3 seasons
Australia
Australian Formula 3